Death Knocks Three Times is a 1949 mystery thriller novel by Anthony Gilbert, the pen name of British writer Lucy Beatrice Malleson. It is the twenty second in her long-running series featuring the unscrupulous London solicitor Arthur Crook, one of the more unorthodox detectives of the Golden Age.

Synopsis
While travelling back to London during a storm, Crook is forced to shake shelter at the house of the eccentric Colonel Sherren in Chipping Magna. Soon afterwards he is called back to give evidence at the inquest following the old man's death in his bathtub. His suspicions are aroused when he discovers he was not the only member of the family to die recently.

References

Bibliography
 Magill, Frank Northen . Critical Survey of Mystery and Detective Fiction: Authors, Volume 2. Salem Press, 1988.
Murphy, Bruce F. The Encyclopedia of Murder and Mystery. Springer, 1999.
 Reilly, John M. Twentieth Century Crime & Mystery Writers. Springer, 2015.

1949 British novels
British mystery novels
British thriller novels
Novels by Anthony Gilbert
Novels set in England
Novels set in London
British detective novels
Collins Crime Club books